Siegfried Leopold Kratochwil (March 24, 1916 – February 25, 2005) was an Austrian painter and poet. Born in Karlstift, Lower Austria, he later moved to Vienna and became one of the best-known Austrian Naïve artists by the end of the 20th century.

Background
Siegfried L. Kratochwil was born in the small logging village of Karlstift in Lower Austria. After enrolling in a trade school in Vienna, he became a technician and tool maker. The Second World War was a very hard time for Kratochwil and he was forced to try his hand at various professions. He married in 1939 and the initial years of marriage took place during the war. His ill health kept him from military duty.

Kratochwil began helping his daughter with drawings and paintings, after she was born in 1941. It soon became apparent to him that painting made him happy. A passion for painting thus blossomed, one that would span almost 50 years, focusing primarily on Viennese motifs, which were, in turn, rooted in deeper themes of Austrian culture and history. Kratochwil also spent a significant amount of time writing poetry and etching copper engravings. Each of his paintings were usually accompanied by a poem.

Kratochwil had always considered Austria his home, which is why his country and his lifelong experiences there were so central to his artwork. He was buried in Vienna in 2005 at the age of 89.

Exhibitions and Museums

Aside from the many cities in Austria, his exhibitions have spanned the continents of Europe and North America. Much of his work is currently held in private collections and museums.
The following museums contain some of Kratochwil's artwork:
Historical Museum of the City of Vienna, Austria 
Clemens-Sels-Museum, Neuss, Germany 
Vestisches Museum, Recklinghausen, Germany 
Museum for German Ethnic Studies, Berlin, Germany
Museum Rade, Hamburg, Germany
German Bread Museum, Ulm, Germany 
Centraal Museum, Utrecht, Netherlands 
Museum of Naïve Art L'ile de France, Paris, France
Musée international d'Art naïf Anatole Jakovsky, Nice, France 
Lower Austrian Regional Museum, Vienna, Austria 
Robert-Stolz Museum, Vienna, Austria
Musée d'Art Naïf - Max Fourny

Gallery

See also

Naïve Art
Folk Art
Outsider Art
Anatole Jakovsky

References and sources

 Sources
 Der Plumpsack geht um. Alte und neue Kinderspiele (Rowohlt Taschenbuch Publishing 1979) 
 Alt-Wien: die Stadt, die niemals war. Wolfgang Kos, Christian Rapp, Czernin Verlag 2004.

External links

 Siegfried L. Kratochwil website
 Karstift Niederösterreich website
 Food News short artist biographies

1916 births
2005 deaths
20th-century Austrian painters
Austrian male painters
21st-century Austrian painters
21st-century male artists
20th-century Austrian poets
Austrian people of Czech descent
Austrian male poets
Writers from Vienna
Artists from Vienna
People from Gmünd District
20th-century Austrian male writers
20th-century Austrian male artists